Bruno Martins Simão (born 5 May 1985) is a Portuguese former professional footballer who played as a left-back.

He spent most of his career abroad, making 49 appearances with three clubs in Romania's Liga I and also winning cups in Azerbaijan and Moldova, in addition to brief stints in Slovakia, Cyprus and France. Domestically, he totalled 68 games in LigaPro, where he represented four teams.

Club career
Born in Lisbon, Simão was a youth product of S.L. Benfica. Following the decision of club president João Vale e Azevedo of dissolving the club's underage teams, he moved on to G.D. Estoril Praia and C.F. Os Belenenses before returning to the Eagles reserve team. After a brief spell in the Segunda Liga with F.C. Barreirense, he moved abroad for the first time to UTA Arad in Romania's Liga I.

Simão had further experience of the Eastern European country's top flight with FC Dinamo București and FC Astra Giurgiu, with a year at SK Slovan Bratislava in Slovakia in between. In 2010 he signed for Khazar Lankaran FK of the Azerbaijan Premier League, and won the cup in his only season.

Moving on to FC Milsami Orhei of Moldova, Simão was again a cup champion in his first campaign (2011–12), also picking up the Super Cup that summer. After a brief stint in Cyprus with Doxa Katokopias FC without playing, he signed in September 2013 to FC Dacia Chișinău in the previous country.

Simão's eight-year Eastern adventure ended in 2014 as he joined U.D. Leiria in his country's third division, moving on to U.D. Oliveirense in LigaPro that July. Following a brief return to Leiria in July 2015, he signed for Atlético Clube de Portugal of division two.

In August 2017, Simão headed abroad again to sign for US Lusitanos Saint-Maur, a Portuguese-community team in France's fourth tier. He left soon after to C.D. Pinhalnovense in the Portuguese lower leagues, where he suffered a road accident that put him in a coma for two days.

Simão joined Casa Pia A.C. in July 2018, and was part of their squad that defeated U.D. Vilafranquense on penalties to win the third-division title. He was one of three players to be released halfway through the season in January 2020, dropping down a level to S.C.U. Torreense.

Personal life
Simão's younger brother, David, was also a footballer, in the midfielder position. Their cousin, Rúben Amorim, was also a player and manager.

Career statistics

Honours
Khazar Lankaran
Azerbaijan Cup: 2010–11

Milsami
Moldovan Cup: 2011–12
Moldovan Super Cup: 2012

Casa Pia
Campeonato de Portugal: 2018–19

References

External links

1985 births
Living people
Portuguese footballers
Footballers from Lisbon
Association football defenders
Liga Portugal 2 players
Campeonato de Portugal (league) players
C.F. Os Belenenses players
S.L. Benfica B players
F.C. Barreirense players
U.D. Leiria players
U.D. Oliveirense players
Atlético Clube de Portugal players
C.D. Fátima players
C.D. Pinhalnovense players
Casa Pia A.C. players
S.C.U. Torreense players
Clube Oriental de Lisboa players
Liga I players
Liga II players
FC UTA Arad players
FC Dinamo București players
FC Astra Giurgiu players
Slovak Super Liga players
ŠK Slovan Bratislava players
Azerbaijan Premier League players
Khazar Lankaran FK players
Moldovan Super Liga players
FC Milsami Orhei players
FC Dacia Chișinău players
Doxa Katokopias FC players
Championnat National 2 players
US Lusitanos Saint-Maur players
Portugal youth international footballers
Portuguese expatriate footballers
Expatriate footballers in Romania
Expatriate footballers in Slovakia
Expatriate footballers in Azerbaijan
Expatriate footballers in Moldova
Expatriate footballers in Cyprus
Expatriate footballers in France
Portuguese expatriate sportspeople in Romania
Portuguese expatriate sportspeople in Slovakia
Portuguese expatriate sportspeople in Azerbaijan
Portuguese expatriate sportspeople in Moldova
Portuguese expatriate sportspeople in Cyprus
Portuguese expatriate sportspeople in France